

Notable people
 Bill Minkin , American comedian and singer
 Charlee Minkin (born 1981), American Olympic judoka
 David Minkin, American magician
 Jacob Minkin, American rabbi
 Eric Minkin (born 1950), American-Israeli basketball player

Yiddish-language surnames